Cassidulus mitis is a species of sea urchin of the family Cassidulidae. Their armour is covered with spines. Cassidulus mitis was first scientifically described in 1954 by Krau.

References 

Animals described in 1954
Cassidulidae